Myland (also called Mile End) is a civil parish in Essex, England.  It is now a northern suburb of Colchester. The original village began approximately one mile north of the centre of Colchester which probably accounts for its name.  This has varied over the centuries but essentially with the same meaning.  It is the only part of Colchester to be a civil parish.

Myland rises from about 19 metres in the south to about 50 metres in the north.  It is within 30 minutes driving time of Sudbury and Ipswich.

The earliest record of the original village is from 1254 when Mile End became a separate church parish. In the English Civil War, Colonel Fothergill's fort, a major Roundhead stronghold was located in the village. Daniel Defoe held a long lease on Tubswick, an ancient house in the village which burned down on 7 December 2009.  He is said to have leased Tubswick for his daughter.  His book "Moll Flanders" mentions Mile End.

Colchester Borough Council has granted planning consent to two major housing developments in Myland, totalling more than 3,000 homes.  These decisions have provoked strong local opposition. The larger development, of 1,600 homes, is on greenfield land and is to include a new primary school, a new secondary school, a retail area and a community centre, all to be completed by 2021. The smaller development will add some 1,500 new homes on the former Severalls Hospital site, plus a primary school and community centre.

Myland Community Council, founded in 1999, represents the Myland community.  Its Clerk and Responsible Financial Officer is Katherine Kane.  The council is chaired by Alison Jay.

The parish has two public houses, 'The Bricklayers' and 'The Dog and Pheasant', as well as three churches/chapels.  These are St. Michael's Parish Church (Church of England), a Methodist chapel and a Catholic church. There are three primary schools: Myland (in Mill Rd), Queen Boudica (off Turner Rd) and Camulos Academy (off Via Urbis Romanae).  Both Colchester General Hospital and the private Oaks Hospital are to be found in the parish.

Despite its size, Myland has no community centre.

Myland has two areas of playing fields.  Both are owned and maintained by the Borough Council.  To the west, Mile End Playing Fields offer facilities for football and cricket while to the east, Mill Road Playing Fields are home to Colchester Rugby Club, supporting rugby union, cricket and archery.

Colchester United F.C.'s ground, The Weston Homes Community Stadium, is on the Cuckoo Farm/Severalls development in the north of the parish.

References

External links
 Myland Community Council Website
 Parish Church Website

Civil parishes in Essex
Colchester (town)